PVK may refer to:

Papuan Volunteer Corps (Papoea Vrijwilligers Korps)
Pirates, Vikings and Knights
Aktion National Airport (IATA Code PVK)
PVK Jadran
Poly-(N-vinyl carbazole)